Frederick Christian may refer to:

 Frederick Christian (cricketer) (1877–1941), English cricketer
 Frederick Christian, Count of Schaumburg-Lippe (1655–1728)
 Frederick Christian, Elector of Saxony (1722–1763)
 Frederick Christian, Margrave of Brandenburg-Bayreuth (1708–1769)
 Frederick Christian I, Duke of Schleswig-Holstein-Sonderburg-Augustenburg (1721–1794)
 Frederick Christian II, Duke of Schleswig-Holstein-Sonderburg-Augustenburg (1765–1814)
 Frederick Martin Christian (1883–1971), politician from Pitcairn

See also